Loon Lake Airport  is located adjacent to Loon Lake, Saskatchewan, Canada. The airstrip is a grass runway suitable for small planes only, but the Saskatchewan Air Ambulance can land and take off there.

See also 
List of airports in Saskatchewan

References 

Registered aerodromes in Saskatchewan
Loon Lake No. 561, Saskatchewan